Leonard Abrahamson (April 29, 1896 - 1961), known as 'the Abe', was an Irish surgeon specialising in cardiology.

Born in Odessa, Ukraine, he was, from the 1920s to the 1960s, described as the "natural leader of the Jewish community" in Ireland. Educated at the Abbey Christian Brothers' Grammar School in Newry, Abrahamson initially went to Trinity College Dublin on a scholarship in Gaelic and Hebrew. He transferred to the School of Physic and consolidated his medical training with a year's postgraduate study in Paris in 1921.

Abrahamson was appointed as a physician to the staff of Mercer's Hospital in 1920 and then Professor of Materia Medica and Therapeutics in the Royal College of Surgeons in Ireland (RCSI). He published extensively on cardiology, he was a member of the Association of Physicians of Great Britain and Ireland and President of the Biological Society in Trinity College Dublin.  He was appointed Professor of Medicine at RCSI in 1934, a chair he held until his death in 1961. The Cardiac Club founded in 1922 in Oxford, elected Leonard Abrahamson a member in 1934. Abrahamson was President of the Royal College of Physicians in Ireland (1949), having earlier (1941) been appointed to the first board of the House of Industry hospitals by Seán MacEntee.

Abrahamson attended Bill Beckett, father of Samuel Beckett, on the day of his death from a heart attack on 26 June 1933.  He was married to Max Nurock's sister, Matilde.
He was father of prominent lawyer Max Abrahamson and grandfather of film director Lenny Abrahamson.

References

1896 births
1961 deaths
Alumni of Trinity College Dublin
Irish Jews
Irish cardiologists
People from Odesa
Presidents of the Royal College of Physicians of Ireland
Burials at Dolphins Barn Jewish Cemetery